Mickey Brantford (26 March 1911 – 18 October 1984) was an English actor and film production manager .

Mickey Brantford was born Michael Richard Henry Comerford into a theatrical family, in London. He began his career in the silent film era as a popular child actor, and appeared in a series of Sexton Blake shorts as the detective's assistant, Tinker.

Selected filmography
 A Man the Army Made (1917)
 The Game of Life (1922)
 The Sporting Instinct (1922)
 The Knockout (1923)
 This Freedom (1923)
 The Rest Cure (1923)
 Not for Sale (1924)
 Afraid of Love (1925)
 Thou Fool (1926)
 ‘’Mare Nostrum’’ (1926)
 Second to None (1927)
 Carry On (1927)
 The Rolling Road (1927)
 Dawn (1928)
 The Burgomaster of Stilemonde (1929)
 Suspense (1930)
 The Stolen Necklace (1933)
 Temptation (1934)
 My Old Dutch (1934)
 Me and Marlborough (1935)
 The Phantom Light (1935)
 My Heart is Calling (1935)
 Strictly Illegal (1935)
 Twice Branded (1936)
 The Last Journey (1936)
 Where There's a Will (1936)
 Darby and Joan (1937)
 The Reverse Be My Lot (1937)

References

Bibliography
 Holmstrom, John. The Moving Picture Boy: An International Encyclopaedia from 1895 to 1995, Norwich, Michael Russell, 1996, p. 48.

External links

1911 births
1984 deaths
Male actors from London
English male film actors
English male silent film actors
English male child actors
20th-century English male actors